The 2020 Speedway Grand Prix season was the 26th season of the Speedway Grand Prix era, and decided the 75th FIM Speedway World Championship. It was the 20th series under the promotion of Benfield Sports International, an IMG company

A new points system was introduced with overall positions deciding the number of championship points a rider scored from a Grand Prix (GP), and points scored in each individual heat used to determine a rider's progress in a GP.

The series was dominated by Polish venues with six of the eight races held in Poland. Bartosz Zmarzlik was the defending champion, having won the 2019 Speedway Grand Prix series, and he successfully retained his title in 2020 by winning four of the eight rounds. Former three-time champion Tai Woffinden finished second after winning a run-off with Fredrik Lindgren. Maciej Janowski, Leon Madsen and Jason Doyle completed the top six, thus earning places in the 2021 series.

Qualification 
For the 2020 season there were 15 permanent riders, who were joined at each Grand Prix by one wild card and two track reserves.

The top eight riders from the 2019 championship qualified automatically. These riders were joined by the three riders who qualified via the Grand Prix Challenge.

The final four riders were nominated by series promoters, Benfield Sports International, following the completion of the 2019 season.

Qualified riders 

•Michelsen was handed a spot after initial wildcard pick Greg Hancock announced his retirement from the sport and first reserve Martin Smolinski withdrew due to injury.

Qualified substitutes 

The following riders were nominated as substitutes:

Calendar

The 2020 season originally consisted of 10 events, the same number as in 2019. The Slovenian round had been replaced by a new round in Russia. The British Grand Prix was originally scheduled to be held on July 18, but was cancelled on June 1. The first round in Warsaw was postponed to August 28, the Czech Grand Prix was postponed to September 19 & the German Grand Prix was postponed to a unknown date, all due to the COVID-19 pandemic. The rounds in Hallstavik and Målilla were cancelled on June 18.
On July 29 a final revised calendar was published by the organisers of the series, with a total of 8 rounds; 6 in Poland and 2 in the Czech Republic.

Final Classification

See also 
 2020 Individual Speedway Junior World Championship

References

External links 
 SpeedwayGP.com – Speedway World Championships

 
2020
Grand Prix